Chronoxenus myops is a species of ant of the genus Chronoxenus. It was described by Forel in 1895.

References

Dolichoderinae
Insects of India
Insects of China
Insects described in 1895